William Bertram Floyd (born  1885) was an English footballer. Born in Frodingham, Lincolnshire, he played 97 times in The Football League for Gainsborough Trinity in two separate spells between 1904 and 1912, and also had a lengthy stint with New Brompton of the Southern League, where he made 99 league and FA Cup appearances.

References

1885 births
Year of death missing
Sportspeople from Scunthorpe
English footballers
Gillingham F.C. players
Bristol Rovers F.C. players 
Gainsborough Trinity F.C. players
English Football League players
Southern Football League players
Association footballers not categorized by position